Project Makeover (also known as Operation Makeover or Go Go Sister) is a 2007 South Korean film. In an online poll conducted by web portal Daum, Korean netizens named Project Makeover as the worst film of 2007.

Plot 
Na Jung-ju is a 30-year-old woman whose life is going nowhere, and she blames her misery on a failed high school romance with Jo Ha-ni, who has since become a famous singer. Her old schoolfriend Oh Tae-hun, who used to have a big crush on her, is now a successful and wealthy businessman, and she regrets not having gone out with him. After being given the chance to travel back in time, Jung-ju goes back to 1994 where she tries to convince her younger self to date the future businessman.

Cast 
 Ko So-young ... Na Jung-ju (age 30)
 Jo An ... Na Jung-ju (age 18)
 Yoo Gun ... Oh Tae-hun (age 18)
 Lee Beom-soo ... Oh Tae-hun
 Lee Joong-moon ... Jo Ha-ni (age 18)
 Oh Mi-hee ... Jung-ju's mother
 Ok Ji-yeong ... Jung-ju's friend (?)
 Oh Dal-su ... Jung-ju's father

Release 
Project Makeover was released in South Korea on January 4, 2007, and on its opening weekend was ranked fifth at the box office with 110,708 admissions.

References

External links 
 
 
 

2007 films
2007 romantic comedy films
South Korean romantic comedy films
Films about time travel
Cinema Service films
2000s Korean-language films
2000s South Korean films